Steptoe and Son Ride Again is a 1973 British comedy film. It is a sequel to the film Steptoe and Son (1972) based on the television series. As usual, the film starred Wilfrid Brambell and Harry H. Corbett.

Plot
The Steptoes have retired their horse - because the horse is lame, after having to pull the cart (and Harold) home from York, after the horse walked into the back of a removal van which then drove off - and plan to buy a new one with Albert's life savings of £80, putting £9 away for "emergencies". Harold sends Albert home and returns several hours later drunk and introduces Hercules the Second, a short sighted racing greyhound. Harold reveals to Albert that he purchased this from local gangster and loan shark Frankie Barrow for the £80 plus a further £200 owing on top. Furthermore, he plans to pay a small fortune to keep it fed on egg and steak.

They eventually have to sell all of their possessions to have one final bet on their dog at the races to try to pay off the money they owe. When their dog loses, they just about lose hope when Albert brings up that he had saved £1,000 in a life insurance policy. Harold then schemes to get the money from his father by faking his death. They find an old mannequin among their collection of junk and fit it around Albert's body. They then call Dr. Popplewell, a known alcoholic doctor, who is drunk at the time of seeing Albert and he announces that Albert has died. The next day, Harold then brings home a coffin that he has been saving for the inevitable day that his father would actually die.  Albert is horrified when Harold tells him he also bought a tombstone because the undertaker was having a sale.

Later on, the gangsters turn up to collect the outstanding debt, but after some intimidation Harold manages to stave them off when he shows them that Albert has "died" and they will get their money when the insurance policy pays out. Later on, old friends of Albert's come to visit and pay their respects to Albert. They announce that they have arranged a funeral for him and this is not good news for either of the Steptoes. Later one of Albert's friends asks if he could look at him for a final time. Knowing that the coffin is actually full of scrap metal, Harold makes the excuse that his father's face is all distorted because of a difficult visit to the lavatory which is what caused him to die.

Later on an entire army of mourners come to the Steptoe household. Along with them Mr Russell from the insurance company enters. Harold meets him to collect the proceeds - only to find out that all of the insurance money is to go to a lover that Albert met in 1949 while Harold was in the army in Malaya. A furious Harold asks why he did not cancel the insurance plan and Albert's only excuse is "I forgot." Harold concocts a way of bringing Albert back to life. However once inside the coffin, Albert falls into a deep sleep and nothing seems to wake him up. Harold tries to wake him several times during the journey to the cemetery, however on the way he is hit in the head by the back door of a removal truck. They decide to take Harold to the hospital and carry on to the funeral without him. At the hospital Harold runs away and gets a taxi to the cemetery.

There Harold accidentally smashes into a tomb and whilst being buried Albert finally wakes up and frightens everyone away. The vicar runs off and meets Harold looking like he himself is one of the undead. Back home, the Steptoes discover that the insurance claim would have paid out to Harold after all, due to a clause that Albert had put in the policy if his mistress ever married. He cashes the policy in and receives £876. They pay off their debt and buy a new horse with new riding equipment, but to Albert's horror, Harold invests the rest of the money in a part share of a race horse. He discovers that his partner is called H.M. Queen.

Cast
 Wilfrid Brambell as Albert Steptoe
 Harry H. Corbett as Harold Steptoe
 Diana Dors as Woman in Flat
 Milo O'Shea as Dr. Popplewell
 Bill Maynard as George
 Neil McCarthy as Lennie
 Yootha Joyce as Freda, Lennie's wife
 George Tovey as Percy
 Olga Lowe as Rita, Percy's wife
 Sam Kydd as Claude
 Joyce Hemson as Flo, Claude's wife
 Henry Woolf as Frankie Barrow
 Geoffrey Bayldon as Vicar
 Frank Thornton as Mr. Russell
 Richard Davies as Butcher
 Stewart Bevan as Vet
 Peter Brayham as the Chicken/Pigeon Keeper. (uncredited)

Production
The film was one of a number of 1970s British comedies featuring a small role for Diana Dors.

Filming locations
 The removal company featured in the film was the then state-owned Pickfords Removals.
 The greyhound racing scenes were shot at White City Stadium.
Greyhound training was filmed in Acton Park.

External links

References

1973 films
1973 comedy films
British comedy films
British sequel films
Films based on television series
Films directed by Peter Sykes
Films set in London
Films scored by Roy Budd
Films scored by Ron Grainer
Steptoe and Son
Films and television featuring Greyhound racing
EMI Films films
1970s English-language films
1970s British films